The Sullivan Center, formerly known as the Carson, Pirie, Scott and Company Building or Carson, Pirie, Scott and Company Store, is a commercial building at 1 South State Street at the corner of East Madison Street in Chicago, Illinois. Louis Sullivan designed it for the retail firm Schlesinger & Mayer in 1899 and later expanded it before H.G. Selfridge & Co. purchased the structure in 1904.  That firm occupied the structure for only a matter of weeks before it sold the building (the land under it was owned at the time by Marshall Field) to Otto Young, who then leased it to Carson Pirie Scott for $7,000 per month, which occupied the building for more than a century until 2006. Subsequent additions were completed by Daniel Burnham in 1906 and Holabird & Root in 1961.

The building has been used for retail purposes since 1899, and has been a Chicago Landmark since 1975. It is part of the Loop Retail Historic District.

Architecture

The Sullivan Center was initially developed because of the Chicago Great Fire of 1871. In 1872, the Leopold Schlesinger and David Mayer decided to open a dry good store. They had met while working together prior to the Chicago Fire. Leopold Schlesinger had immigrated to Chicago in 1862 from Germany, and David Mayer was brought to the United States of America as an infant in 1852, also from Germany. In 1881 Schlesinger and Mayer had moved their dry-goods store into the Bowen Building that was on the corner of State and Madison. In 1890, Schlesinger and Mayer hired Adler and Sullivan to prepare plans for the removal of the Bowen Building's attic story and the addition of two stories across the Bowen Building and the adjacent four-story structure to the south. The facades were added to match the bottom stories of the building and the building was painted white.

In 1892, Schlesinger and Mayer hired Adler and Sullivan to do further remodeling and add a new entrance to the corner of State and Madison. In 1896, Sullivan, no longer working with Adler, was asked back by Schlesinger and Mayer to redesign the façade and add two stories to the newly leased four-story building on Wabash avenue, as well as connecting it to the State Street store. That never happened because Schlesinger and Mayer changed their minds to make it a ten-story building, which also never happened. It eventually got painted white and then a bridge was added that connected the second story of the building to the elevated railroad. In 1898, Schlesinger and Mayer decided to remove the original building located on State and Madison replace it with a new building designed by Sullivan. Sullivan had both a nine and twelve-story proposal made up for this new building. They eventually started with a nine-story portion of the building that was made on the Madison Street side next to the original portion of the Adler and Sullivan renovations.

In 1902, Schlesinger and Mayer came back to Sullivan wanting a twenty-story building on State and Madison, eventually settling for the final twelve stories. The Madison Street portion that was added earlier did not structurally support twelve stories so was left as is. Sullivan came up with a three-stage plan to finish the new building and allow Schlesinger and Mayer to keep their business running during the Christmas season.

The building is remarkable for its steel-framed structure, which allowed a dramatic increase in window area created by bay-wide windows, which in turn allowed for the greatest amount of daylight into the building interiors. This steel framed structure uses the post-and-lintel technique to provide a strong, light, and fireproof steel skeleton. The exterior of the building consists of a grid of piers and spandrels that reveals the post-and-lintel technique that supports the building. The design was the first use of what became known as the Chicago window. At street level, the broad expanses of glass allowed for larger displays of merchandise to outside pedestrian traffic creating the idea of the sidewalk showcase.  In between the windows were bands of terra cotta, replacing an earlier plan for white Georgia marble, to save cost and weight and to avoid delays arising from a stonecutter's strike. The design featured bronze-plated cast-iron ornamental work above the rounded tower.  The project also included a fire suppression sprinkler system, supplied from a  water tower on the roof.

Sullivan designed the corner entry to be seen from both State and Madison.  The attractive ornamentation above the entrance would give the store an elegant and unique persona important to the building's competition with neighboring stores. The building is one of the classic structures of the Chicago school. The way this technique was used on the lower floors of the building was so elaborate that it used the natural lighting and shadows to seem almost as if it were magically floating above the ground.  The top floor of the 1899 and 1904 sections of the building were recessed to create a narrow loggia topped by an intricately detailed cornice that projected beyond the facade of the building.  This was removed around 1948 and the 12th floor redesigned to replicate the lower floors.

In the early years of development there was an addition that grew to be very valuable in spotting the building from afar. This addition was the pedestrian bridge that connected the train station, behind the store on Wabash Avenue, to the second floor of the Sullivan Center. This too was coated in elaborate metalwork and provided a sense of special entry to those who used it.

In February 2006, the first phase of a multi-year restoration of the building's upper facade was completed.  In addition to cleaning, the cornice and supporting columns were recreated on the 12th floor.  A 2001 report put the budget at $68.9 million for this renovation.

In August 2006, Bon-Ton Stores Inc., parent company of Carson Pirie Scott, announced that after the 2006 Christmas season, the department store in the building would close.  There were no immediate announcements as to what would occupy the building after the store's closure. After holding clearance sales, Carson's closed in February 2007.

The  three-building complex, now renamed the Sullivan Center, is currently owned by Madison Capital, a private real estate company  based in New York City.

In 2008, a second renovation project of the decorative iron work on the lower three floors began.  This included the State Street facade as well as rear portions of the building which face Wabash Avenue.  Part of the funding for this renovation was provided by the City of Chicago.  The Wabash facade was completed in August 2009 and the work on State Street in late 2010.

Tenants of the Sullivan Center include The Chicago Community Trust, the School of the Art Institute of Chicago and Gensler.  In December 2010, Freed and Associates announced it was in talks with retailer Target, who expressed an interest in occupying part of the structure.  On February 15, 2011, the retailer announced it would lease  spread over two floors of the building. The new store opened July 26, 2012, and was met with favorable reviews for its clean design while being sensitive to the historic character of the structure.

See also 
 Chicago architecture
 National Historic Landmark

References

External links

Commercial buildings completed in 1899
Commercial buildings on the National Register of Historic Places in Chicago
Department stores on the National Register of Historic Places
Louis Sullivan buildings
National Historic Landmarks in Chicago
Skyscrapers in Chicago
1899 establishments in Illinois
Art Nouveau architecture in Chicago
Art Nouveau commercial buildings
Individually listed contributing properties to historic districts on the National Register in Illinois
Chicago school architecture in Illinois
Chicago Landmarks